Michael Rowe is a Canadian actor and musician. He is best known for his portrayal of Floyd Lawton / Deadshot in the television series Arrow.

Career
Michael Rowe came from a family of musicians. After seeing his father perform in a band, he took up drumming at the age of 6. In 1996, he began his career as part of a punk/metal band called Bucket Truck for ten years. After splitting up, Rowe and his brother, Andrew, decided to enter filmmaking. Rowe admitted that he had difficulty getting his name signed due to it sounding similar to Dirty Jobs host Mike Rowe. Despite having only acted for roughly five years, Rowe was immediately cast as the DC Comics character Deadshot in the television series Arrow.

After playing Deadshot for four years, he left the series, though Rowe has expressed interest in returning. He was cast as the Valiant Comics character Ninjak. Rowe stars in Crown and Anchor, a movie he co-wrote with Andrew.

In 2019 he received a Canadian Screen Award nomination for Best Actor for his performance in the film Crown and Anchor.

Filmography

References

External links

Living people
Canadian male television actors
21st-century Canadian male actors
People from St. John's, Newfoundland and Labrador
Male actors from Newfoundland and Labrador
Year of birth missing (living people)
Film producers from Newfoundland and Labrador